TJU may refer to: 

 Tianjin University, a national university in Tianjin, China
 Tongji University, a national university in Shanghai, China
 Kulob Airport (IATA:TJU), an airport in Kulob, Khatlon, Tajikistan.